The 1934–35 Irish Cup was the 55th edition of the premier knock-out cup competition in Northern Irish football. 

Glentoran won the tournament for the 6th time, defeating Larne 1–0 in the second final replay at Windsor Park, after the two previous matches had finished in a draw.

Results

First round

|}

Quarter-finals

|}

Replay

|}

Second replay

|}

Semi-finals

|}

Final

Replay

Second replay

References

External links
 Northern Ireland Cup Finals. Rec.Sport.Soccer Statistics Foundation (RSSSF)

Irish Cup seasons
1934–35 domestic association football cups
1934–35 in Northern Ireland association football